This article is about the particular significance of the year 1841 to Wales and its people.

Incumbents
Lord Lieutenant of Anglesey – Henry Paget, 1st Marquess of Anglesey 
Lord Lieutenant of Brecknockshire – Penry Williams
Lord Lieutenant of Caernarvonshire – Peter Drummond-Burrell, 22nd Baron Willoughby de Eresby 
Lord Lieutenant of Cardiganshire – William Edward Powell
Lord Lieutenant of Carmarthenshire – George Rice, 3rd Baron Dynevor 
Lord Lieutenant of Denbighshire – Robert Myddelton Biddulph   
Lord Lieutenant of Flintshire – Robert Grosvenor, 1st Marquess of Westminster 
Lord Lieutenant of Glamorgan – John Crichton-Stuart, 2nd Marquess of Bute 
Lord Lieutenant of Merionethshire – Edward Lloyd-Mostyn, 2nd Baron Mostyn
Lord Lieutenant of Monmouthshire – Capel Hanbury Leigh
Lord Lieutenant of Montgomeryshire – Edward Herbert, 2nd Earl of Powis
Lord Lieutenant of Pembrokeshire – Sir John Owen, 1st Baronet
Lord Lieutenant of Radnorshire – George Rodney, 3rd Baron Rodney

Bishop of Bangor – Christopher Bethell 
Bishop of Llandaff – Edward Copleston 
Bishop of St Asaph – William Carey 
Bishop of St Davids – Connop Thirlwall

Events
19 February - The Governor Fenner, carrying emigrants to America, sinks off Holyhead after colliding with a steamer, with the loss of 123 lives.
9 March - The first known photograph is taken in Wales, of Margam Castle by Calvert Jones.
12 April - The Taff Vale Railway is extended to Merthyr Tydfil
26 July - The proprietors of The Skerries Lighthouse off Anglesey, the last privately owned light in the British Isles, are awarded £444,984 in compensation for its sale to Trinity House.
19 August - In the United Kingdom general election, William Edwards stands as a Chartist candidate in Monmouth Boroughs and becomes the only Parliamentary candidate in Wales, ever, not to win a single vote.
8 December - The month-old Albert Edward, eldest son of Queen Victoria of the United Kingdom, is created Prince of Wales by letters patent.
date unknown
Founding of Bala-Bangor Congregational College.
Poor Law Amendment Act is passed, largely thanks to the efforts of Sir George Cornewall Lewis.
Mordecai Jones opens a brewery at Brecon.
The Brymbo ironworks are bought out of Chancery after a long period of litigation and reopened by a limited company.
Opening of Swansea Museum by the Royal Institution of South Wales.
Land is earmarked by Welsh immigrants in Ohio for the building of Tyn Rhos Chapel.

Arts and literature

New books
David Owen (Brutus) - Gweithrediadau yr Eglwys Sefydledig
Welsh Book of Common Prayer (new edition)

Music

Births
28 January - Sir Henry Morton Stanley, explorer (as John Rowlands; died 1904)
14 February
Sir John Gibson, journalist (died 1915)
William Reginald Herbert, horseman (died 1929)
5 April - Robert Rees, singer and musician (died 1892)
23 April - Henry Hughes, minister and historian (died 1924)
29 April - Francis Grenfell, 1st Baron Grenfell, soldier (died 1925)
21 May - Joseph Parry, composer (died 1903)
26 June (in London) - James Cholmeley Russell, railway entrepreneur (died 1912)
9 November (in London) - Edward Albert, Prince of Wales (later Edward VII of the United Kingdom (died 1910)

Deaths
17 January - David Owen (Dewi Wyn o Eifion), poet, 56
12 May - Joseph Tudor Hughes, harpist, 13 (drowning)
19 May - John Blackwell (Alun), poet, 42
1 May - David Jones, missionary, 44
24 May - Thomas Roberts, Llwyn'rhudol, co-founder of Cymdeithas y Gwyneddigion, 75-80
8 June - John Elias, preacher, 67
4 December - David Daniel Davis, physician, 64

References

Wales